Langwedel is a municipality in the district of Verden, in Lower Saxony, Germany. It is situated on the right bank of the Weser, approx. 7 km northwest of Verden, and 30 km southeast of Bremen.

Langwedel belonged to the Prince-Bishopric of Verden, established in 1180. In 1648 the Prince-Bishopric was transformed into the Principality of Verden, which was first ruled in personal union by the Swedish Crown - interrupted by a Danish occupation (1712–1715) - and from 1715 on by the Hanoverian Crown. The Kingdom of Hanover incorporated the Principality in a real union and the Princely territory, including Langwedel, became part of the new Stade Region, established in 1823.

Organization 
Langwedel is a unit municipality and consists of the following villages:
 Daverden (13,005 km2).
 Etelsen (with Cluvenhagen and Hagen-Grinden as well as Giersberg and Steinberg).(23,874 km2)
 Haberloh (5,404 km2).
 Holtebüttel (with Dahlbrügge, Nindorf, Schülingen and Overing and Förth) (8,492 km2).
 Langwedel (with Langwedelermoor) (7,619 km2).
 Völkersen (17,716 km2).

References

Verden (district)